José Moreno (born 25 May 1962) is an Ecuadorian footballer. He played in five matches for the Ecuador national football team from 1984 to 1985. He was also part of Ecuador's squad for the 1983 Copa América tournament.

References

1962 births
Living people
Ecuadorian footballers
Ecuador international footballers
Association football midfielders
People from Ambato, Ecuador
L.D.U. Quito footballers
C.D. El Nacional footballers
Ecuadorian football managers
Imbabura S.C. managers